The following is the list of venues for the 2019 Pan American Games and 2019 Parapan American Games held in Lima, Peru and surrounding cities from July 26 to August 11, 2019 and from August 23 to September 1, 2019 respectively.

Venues

Ceremonies Venue

Cluster A

Villa Deportiva Regional del Callao

San Miguel

Stand alone

Cluster B

Villa Deportiva Nacional Videna

Stand alone

Cluster C

Villa María del Triunfo

Escuela Militar de Chorrilos

Stand alone

Cluster D

Venues outside of Lima

References

External links
Official website venue information

2019 Pan American Games
2019 Parapan American Games
Venues of the Pan American Games
Sports venues in Lima
Venues of the 2019 Pan and Parapan American Games